The Air Force Technical Applications Center, originally organized in 1959 as 1035th U.S. Air Force Field Activities Group, operated five technical operation squadrons to support its nuclear treaty monitoring mission.

See also
 List of United States Air Force squadrons
 Air Force Technical Applications Center (AFTAC)

References

Technical operations